The 2016 FIBA U16 Women's European Championship Division C was the 12th edition of the Division C of the FIBA U16 Women's European Championship, the third tier of the European women's under-16 basketball championship. It was played in Andorra la Vella, Andorra, from 18 to 23 July 2016. Georgia women's national under-16 basketball team won the tournament.

Participating teams

First round

Group A

Group B

Playoffs

Final standings

References

External links
FIBA official website

2016
2016–17 in European women's basketball
FIBA U16
Sports competitions in Andorra la Vella
FIBA